There are many examples of the McDonnell Douglas F-4 Phantom IIs on display around the world, often in aviation museums and at facilities that once operated the McDonnell Douglas F-4 Phantom II. A few F-4s are also preserved as gate guardians, and some are also owned privately.

Australia
On display
F-4E
67-0237 - RAAF Museum, Melbourne. An ex-USAF F-4E painted to represent one of the examples flown by the RAAF while awaiting delivery of the F-111.

Belgium
On display
RF-4C
68-0590 - Royal Museum of the Armed Forces and Military History, Brussels.

Chile
On display
F-4C-21
37683 - Museo Nacional Aeronáutico y del Espacio, Santiago. 31 December 1964: first deployed to the 8th TFW GAFB, California; assigned to the 431st TFS. 4 February 1967: assigned to the 366th TFW, Southeast Asia. 15 January 1968: assigned to the 347th TFW. 12 January 1970: transferred to 4452d CCTS, GAFB, CA. 5 April 1972: assigned to the 183d TFG. 10 December 1980: assigned to the 142 CAM Sq, Oregon ANG. 30 March 1995. received in Chile for static display and repainted in SE Asia colors.

Czech Republic

On display
F-4M
XT899/B - Prague Aviation Museum, formerly belonging to No. 19 Squadron RAF, then No. 228 OCU, Nos 6, 29, 92, 23, 56 and finally again No. 19 Squadron RAF.

Germany

On display
RF-4E
35+62 - Luftwaffe-Museum, Berlin.  Former Luftwaffe RF-4E Phantom II.
F-4F
38+04 - Luftwaffe-Museum, Berlin.  Former Luftwaffe F-4F Phantom II.
38+14 - on public display near Wittmundhafen Air Base, Wittmund. Former Luftwaffe F-4F Phantom II.
38+34 - Luftwaffe-Museum, Berlin.  Former Luftwaffe F-4F Phantom II.

Greece
On display
RF-4E
On display in the Hellenic Air Force Museum

Guam
On display
F-4E
1392 -  Andersen Air Force Base. F-4E, serial number 71-1392, tailcode "PN" is currently on display at Andersen AFB. 3d Tactical Fighter Wing, 3rd Tactical Fighter Squadron of the Thirteenth Air Force while stationed at Clark Air Base

Iceland
On display
F-4E
On display as a gate guardian at Keilir Aviation Academy, Keflavik

Israel 

On display
F-4E
On display at the Givat Olga neighborhood of Hadera (IDF serial #702 / Construction Number 4289) 
Twenty-one aircraft, including three RF-4E are on display at the Israeli Air Force Museum  at Hatzerim Airbase in the Negev desert.
F-4E Phantom II, IDF serial #327, Construction Number 3203, United States Air Force s/n 67-0346.
F-4E-32-MC Phantom II, IDF serial #334, Construction Number 2954, United States Air Force s/n 66-0327. Prototype Super Phantom, displayed at 1987 Paris Air Show with show number 229, and civilian registration #4X-JPA
F-4E Phantom II, IDF serial #323, Construction Number 3461, United States Air Force s/n 68-0380.
F-4E Phantom II, IDF serial #156, Construction Number 3920, United States Air Force s/n 69-7245.
RF-4E-44-MC Phantom II, IDF serial #498 (formerly 146), Construction Number 4017, United States Air Force s/n 69-7567.
F-4E Phantom II, IDF serial #614, Construction Number 4020, United States Air Force s/n 69-7568.
F-4E Phantom II, IDF serial #297, Construction Number 4822, United States Air Force s/n 74-1015.
RF-4E Phantom II, IDF serial #485, Construction Number 4930, United States Air Force s/n 75-0418.
F-4E-39-MC Phantom II, IDF serial #122 (formerly 22, 622), Construction Number 3529, United States Air Force s/n 68-0417.
F-4E-42-MC Phantom II, IDF serial #111 (formerly 11), Construction Number 3840, United States Air Force s/n 69-0299.
F-4E-44-MC Phantom II, IDF serial #148 (formerly 648), Construction Number 4021, United States Air Force s/n 69-7569.
F-4E-48-MC Phantom II, IDF serial #189, Construction Number 4223, United States Air Force s/n 71-0235.
F-4E-49-MC Phantom II, IDF serial #208 (formerly 108), Construction Number 4263, United States Air Force s/n 71-1090.
F-4E-41-MC Phantom II, IDF serial #171, Construction Number 3721, United States Air Force s/n 68-0524.
F-4E-60-MC Phantom II, IDF serial #295, Construction Number 4817, United States Air Force s/n 74-1014.
F-4E-36-MC Phantom II, IDF serial #328, Construction Number 3238, United States Air Force s/n 67-0362.
F-4E-41-MC Phantom II, IDF serial #187, Construction Number 3751, United States Air Force s/n 68-0544.
RF-4E-45-MC Phantom II, IDF serial #488 (formerly 198), Construction Number 4061, United States Air Force s/n 69-7592.
F-4E-53-MC Phantom II, IDF serial #261, Construction Number 4354, United States Air Force s/n 71-1791.
F-4E-53-MC Phantom II, IDF serial #266, Construction Number 4391, United States Air Force s/n 71-1792.
F-4E-62-MC Phantom II, IDF serial #223, Construction Number 4885, United States Air Force s/n 74-1027.
One F-4E is on display at the IAF Technological College, Beersheba (tail #277 / serial 4505)

Japan

F-4C 
 64-0679 is preserved as a gate guardian at Misawa Air Base in Aomori Prefecture.
 64‐0913 is preserved as a gate guardian at Kadena Air Base in Okinawa Prefecture.

F-4J 
 155807 is preserved as a gate guardian at Naval Air Facility Atsugi in Kanagawa Prefecture.
F-4EJ Kai
 37-8319 is preserved at Ibaraki Airport, and is situated alongside RF-4EJ Kai 87-6412, having been donated to the airport around the same time as the RF-4EJ.

RF-4EJ Kai
 87-6412 is preserved at Ibaraki Airport, having been donated to the airport following retirement from 501 Hikotai, which are based at the airport's accompanying Hyakuri Air Base.

Republic of Korea

F-4C
 64-0766. This aircraft served with the USAF’s 12th Tactical Fighter Wing in the Vietnam War from 1967 to 1970. It was transferred to the 35th Tactical Fighter Squadron of the 347th Tactical Fighter Wing at Kunsan AB, South Korea. It was later used to train USAF air crews and went on to fly with the Illinois ANG’s 170th Tactical Fighter Squadron and the Oregon ANG’s 123rd Fighter Interceptor Squadron. After its flying career ended, it was transferred to Suwon AB, South Korea in August 1986 to be used as damage-control trainer before being put on display at the War Memorial of Korea.

Spain

On display
F-4C

 12-54, that was used for reconnaissance missions in the 12th Wing from the Spanish Air Force, at Torrejón de Ardoz, Community of Madrid.
 12-29, also from the 12th Wing, in the Spanish Museum of Aeronautics and Astronautics.

United Kingdom

On display
F-4C
63-7699 (United States Air Force) - Midland Air Museum, Coventry.
FG1
XT596 - Fleet Air Arm Museum, Yeovilton.
FGR2
XV408 - Tangmere Military Aviation Museum, Chichester.
XV424 - Royal Air Force museum, London.
XV406 - Solway Aviation Museum, Carlisle.
XV474 - Imperial War Museum, Duxford.
F-4J(UK)
155529 (United States Navy) - Imperial War Museum, Duxford.
F-4S
155848 (United States Marine Corps) - National Museum of Flight, East Fortune.

United States
Airworthy
F-4D
65-0749 - Collings Foundation, Stow, Massachusetts. Painted in markings of MiG killer F-4D aircraft, AF Ser. No. 66-7463, while assigned to the 555th Tactical Fighter Squadron, circa 1972.

On display
F-4A (F4H-1F)
61-148252 - Wings of Freedom Aviation Museum, Horsham, Pennsylvania
145315 - USS Lexington Museum, Corpus Christi, Texas.
148261 - NAS Oceana Air Park, Naval Air Station Oceana, Virginia.
148273 - Air Victory Museum, Lumberton, New Jersey.
148275 - US Naval Academy, Annapolis, Maryland (last F-4A-4-MC Phantom II).

F-4B (F4H-1)
148412 - Heritage In Flight Museum, Lincoln, Illinois.
148400 - Hickory Aviation Museum, Hickory, North Carolina.
152986 - Wedell-Williams Aviation Museum, Patterson, Louisiana. 
153019 - Naval Air Station Key West, Florida

RF-4B
151981 - Flying Leatherneck Historical Foundation and Aviation Museum, Marine Corps Air Station Miramar, California.
157342 - Marine Corps Air Station Cherry Point, North Carolina.
157349 - National Naval Aviation Museum, Naval Air Station Pensacola, Florida.

F-4C
63-7407 - Air Force Flight Test Museum, Edwards Air Force Base, Edwards, California. First F-4C Accepted for testing by the US Air Force.

63-7408 - Tyndall Air Force Base, Panama City, Florida.
63-7415 - Texas Air Museum, Stinson Municipal Airport, San Antonio, Texas.
63-7424 - Hill Aerospace Museum, Hill Air Force Base, Utah.
63-7482 - Minnesota ANG Museum, Minneapolis-Saint Paul Joint Air Reserve Station, St. Paul, Minnesota.
63-7485 - Museum of Aviation, Robins Air Force Base, Warner Robins, Georgia.
63-7487 - Battleship Memorial Park, Mobile, Alabama.
63-7519 - Southern California Logistics Airport, Victorville, California.
63-7534 - Selfridge Military Air Museum, Mount Clemens, Michigan.
63-7537 - Holloman Air Force Base, New Mexico.(marked as 67-0535)
63-7555 - Yankee Air Museum, Belleville, Michigan.
63-7611 - March Air Reserve Base, Riverside, California - displayed on base, not part of the museum. 

63-7628 - Heritage Park at Joint Base Elmendorf–Richardson, Anchorage, Alaska. (Marked as 66-0723)
63‐7623 – American Legion, Fairmount, Indiana. It is the aircraft made famous by Pardo's Push.
63-7693 - March Field Air Museum, March Air Reserve Base, Riverside, California.
63-7704 - Milwaukee Airport, Wisconsin.
64-0664 - Hill Aerospace Museum, Hill Air Force Base, Utah.
64-0673 - Pima Air & Space Museum (adjacent to Davis-Monthan Air Force Base), Tucson, Arizona.
64-0741 - Air Force Flight Test Museum, Edwards Air Force Base, Edwards, California.
64-0748 - Langley Air Force Base, Virginia.
64-0763 – Air Heritage Air Museum in Beaver, Pennsylvania.
64-0770 - Seymour Johnson Air Force Base, Goldsboro, North Carolina.
64-0776 - Museum of Flight, Seattle, Washington.
64-0777 - Cavanaugh Flight Museum, Addison, Texas.
64-0783 - Grissom Air Museum, Grissom Air Reserve Base, Peru, Indiana.
64-0799 - Peterson Air and Space Museum, Peterson Air Force Base, Colorado Springs, Colorado. (marked as 63-7589 of the 57th FIS circa 1978)
64-0806 - Nellis Air Force Base, Nevada.
64-0813 - Air Force Armament Museum, Eglin Air Force Base, Florida. 
64-0815 - Mighty Eighth Air Force Museum, Pooler, Georgia.
64-0816 - Summerall Parade Field, Charleston, South Carolina.
64-0825 - Fort Worth Aviation Museum, Fort Worth, Texas. 
64-0829 - National Museum of the United States Air Force, Wright-Patterson Air Force Base, Ohio.
64-0838 - Aviation Challenge at U.S. Space & Rocket Center, Huntsville, Alabama
64-0844 - Bakalar AFB Museum, Columbus, Indiana
64-0912 - Tulare County Vietnam War Memorial, Tulare, California.
64-0683 - Newark-Heath Airport, Newark, Ohio

RF-4C

62-12201 - Built as a YRF-110A Spectre, later redesignated RF-4C.  On display at Regional Military Museum, Houma, Louisiana.  Formerly on display at Octave Chanute Aerospace Museum (former Chanute Air Force Base), Rantoul, Illinois.
63-7745 - Birmingham Air National Guard Base, Birmingham, Alabama.
63-7746 - March Field Air Museum, March Air Reserve Base, Riverside, California.
63-7748 - Shaw Air Force Base, South Carolina.
64-0998 - Lincoln Air National Guard Base, Lincoln, Nebraska.
64-1000 - Rusty Allen Airport, Lago Vista, Texas.
64-1004 - Air Force Flight Test Museum, Edwards Air Force Base, Edwards, California.
64-1047 - National Museum of the United States Air Force, Wright-Patterson Air Force Base, Ohio.
64-1061 - Minnesota ANG Museum, Minneapolis-Saint Paul Joint Air Reserve Station, St. Paul, Minnesota.
65-0903 - Strategic Air and Space Museum, Ashland, Nebraska.
65-0905 - Hill Aerospace Museum, Hill Air Force Base, Utah.
66-0469 - Hill Aerospace Museum, Hill Air Force Base, Utah.
67-0452 - Air Force Armament Museum, Eglin Air Force Base, Florida 
69-0372 - Air Power Park and Museum, Hampton, Virginia.

F-4D

64-0952 - Aerospace Walk of Honor, Lancaster, California.
64-0965 - Van Zandt County Veteran's Memorial, Canton, Texas.
65-0626 - Empire State Aerosciences Museum, Glenville, New York.
65-0747 - Colonel Joe Kittinger Park at Orlando Executive Airport. Relocated to Orlando Executive Airport, Florida on 22 July 2014 and restored to a Vietnam-era 555th Tactical Fighter Squadron paint scheme on 14 December 2014.
65-0796 - William E. Dyess Elementary School, adjacent to Dyess Air Force Base, Abilene, Texas.
66-0259 - National Guard Militia Museum of New Jersey, Sea Girt, New Jersey.
66-0267 - Homestead Air Reserve Base, Florida.
66-0269 - New England Air Museum, Windsor Locks, Connecticut.
66-0273 - Homestead, Florida; highway median of U.S. 1, just north of 304th Street.  Maintenance responsibility remains with 482d Fighter Wing at nearby Homestead ARB.
66-7463 - Cadet Area Quadrangle, U.S. Air Force Academy, Colorado.  Multiple North Vietnamese Air Force MiG kills by this aircraft while assigned to the 555th Tactical Fighter Squadron during the Vietnam War, including several by USAF fighter aces, retired Brig Gen Steve Ritchie and retired Col Chuck DeBellevue.
66-7468 - 183d Fighter Wing, Capital Airport Air National Guard Station, Springfield, Illinois.
66-7518 - Charles B. Hall Airpark, Tinker Air Force Base, Oklahoma.
66-7554 - Museum of Aviation, Robins Air Force Base, Warner Robins, Georgia.
66-8711 - Hill Aerospace Museum, Hill Air Force Base, Utah.
66-8755 - Freedom Hill Amphitheatre, Sterling Heights, Michigan.
66-8812 - Historic Aviation Memorial Museum, Tyler, Texas.

YF-4E	
F-4C (62-12200) was the first modified to test. Two other YF-4Es were produced by modifying an F-4C (63-7445) and an F-4D (65-0713).
62-12200 - National Museum of the United States Air Force, Wright-Patterson Air Force Base, Ohio.
65-0713 - Air Force Flight Test Museum, Edwards Air Force Base, Edwards, California.

F-4E 

66-0284 - Burke Lakefront Airport, Cleveland, Ohio.
66-0287 - Wings Over the Rockies Air and Space Museum, Denver, Colorado.
66-0289 - Castle Air Museum (former Castle Air Force Base), Atwater, California.
66-0315 - Monett, Missouri.
66-0329 - Pima Air & Space Museum (adjacent to Davis-Monthan Air Force Base), Tucson, Arizona.
66-0368 - Big Spring Vietnam Memorial, Big Spring, Texas
67-0327 - Luke Air Force Base, Arizona.
67-0392 - Virginia Air & Space Center, Hampton, Virginia.
68-0304 - Hill Aerospace Museum, Hill Air Force Base, Utah.
68-0337 - AMARC "Celebrity Row," Davis-Monthan Air Force Base, Arizona.  Five (5) MiG kills ascribed to this aircraft during the Vietnam War.
68-0382 - March Field Air Museum, March Air Reserve Base, Riverside, California.
 71-0247 – Ferra Aerospace, Grove, Oklahoma.
74-0649 - Seymour Johnson Air Force Base, Goldsboro, North Carolina.

YF-4J
Three YF-4Js were converted from existing F-4B airframes (BuNos 151473, 151496, and 151497)
151473 - Gate guardian at Naval Museum of Armament & Technology, Naval Air Weapons Station China Lake, Ridgecrest, California. 
151497 - Pima Air & Space Museum (adjacent to Davis-Monthan Air Force Base), Tucson, Arizona.

F-4J

153071 - Patuxent River Naval Air Museum, Naval Air Station Patuxent River, Lexington Park, Maryland.
153074 - NAS Lakehurst Air Park, Naval Air Engineering Station Lakehurst, New Jersey.   
153077 - Patriots Point Naval & Maritime Museum, USS Yorktown (CV-10), Charleston, South Carolina.
153088 - American Legion Post #38, Baton Rouge, Louisiana.
153812 - Burke Lakefront Airport, Cleveland, Ohio.
153889 - MCAS Kaneohe Bay / Marine Corps Base Hawaii (formerly Marine Corps Air Station Kaneohe Bay, Kaneohe, Hawaii. 
155563 - Valiant Air Command Warbird Museum, Space Coast Regional Airport, Titusville, Florida.

F-4

150442 - Livingston, Louisiana.
150444 - Prairie Aviation Museum, Bloomington, Illinois.
150628 / 286 Intrepid Sea, Air & Space Museum, New York NY.  Marines VMFA 323 
150639 - Warrior Park, Davis-Monthan Air Force Base, Arizona. Painted to look like a USAF F-4C with tail number 64-0639.
152270 - Marine Corps Air Station Beaufort, South Carolina.
152996 - Southern Museum of Flight, Birmingham, Alabama.
153016 - Commemorative Air Force/Arizona Wing, Mesa, Arizona.
153030 - San Diego Aircraft Carrier Museum, USS Midway (CV-41), San Diego, California.
153915 - National Naval Aviation Museum, Naval Air Station Pensacola, Florida.

F-4S
153821 - Fort Worth Aviation Museum, Fort Worth, Texas.
153880 - San Diego Aircraft Carrier Museum, USS Midway (CV-41), San Diego, California.
155764 - MAPS Air Museum, Canton, Ohio.
155872 - Carolinas Aviation Museum, Charlotte Douglas International Airport, Charlotte, North Carolina.
157246 - Flying Leatherneck Aviation Museum, Marine Corps Air Station Miramar, California.
157259 - Point Mugu Missile Park, Naval Air Station Point Mugu, California.
157267 - San Diego Aerospace Museum, San Diego, California.
157293 - Texas Air Museum in Slaton, Texas
157307 - National Air and Space Museum, Washington D.C.

Under restoration
F4H-1
 145310 – Under restoration to airworthy with F4 Phantom II Corporation in Santa Fe, New Mexico. It was previously located at the Wings and Rotors Air Museum in Murrieta, California.

References

Bibliography
 Donald, David and Lake Jon, eds. McDonnell F-4 Phantom: Spirit in the Skies. London: AIRtime Publishing, 2002. .

Display
F-4 Phantom IIs